The Scarecrow, a supervillain in DC Comics and an adversary of the superhero Batman, has been adapted in various forms of media, including films, television series and video games.



Television

 Scarecrow appears in The Batman/Superman Hour episode "The Great Scarecrow Scare", voiced by Ted Knight.
 Scarecrow appears in Challenge of the Super Friends, voiced by Don Messick. This version is a member of the Legion of Doom.
 Scarecrow appears in The Super Powers Team: Galactic Guardians, voiced by Andre Stojka.
 Scarecrow appears in Batman: The Brave and the Bold, voiced by Dee Bradley Baker.
 Jonathan Crane / Scarecrow appears in Gotham, portrayed by Charlie Tahan in the first season and the first half of the fourth season and by David W. Thompson onward. This version was injected by his father Gerald Crane (portrayed by Julian Sands) with a serum meant to eliminate fear, though it drove Jonathan insane and caused him to become the Scarecrow.
 Jonathan Crane appears in the third season of Titans, portrayed by Vincent Kartheiser. This version is a former Arkham Asylum inmate turned profiler and consultant for the GCPD.
 Scarecrow appears in the first season of Harley Quinn, voiced by Rahul Kohli. This version is a member of the Legion of Doom who joins forces with the Joker, who later kills Scarecrow for unmasking Batman as Bruce Wayne and "ruining the mystery" for the Joker.

DC Animated Universe 

The Scarecrow appears in television series set in the DC Animated Universe (DCAU):
 He first appears in Batman: The Animated Series, voiced by Henry Polic II. This version previously worked at Gotham University until he was fired for experimenting on his own students. In the episode "Nothing to Fear", Crane becomes the Scarecrow to seek revenge on the university's board members. Despite running afoul of Batman and exposing him to his fear toxin, Batman eventually defeats Scarecrow by doing the same to him, exposing the latter's chiroptophobia. Following this, Scarecrow makes further appearances in the episodes "Fear of Victory", in which he combines his fear toxin with adrenaline to use on Gotham's athletes and bet against them; "Dreams of Darkness", in which he plots to taint Gotham's water supply with fear toxin; and "Trial", in which he and several Arkham Asylum inmates participate in a kangaroo court against Batman as a member of the jury.
 Scarecrow returns in The New Batman Adventures, voiced by Jeffrey Combs in the episode "Never Fear" and by an uncredited Jeff Bennett in the episode "Over the Edge". For this series, he sports a "darker" design resembling a cross between a corpse and a Western preacher with a noose around his neck. Series co-creator Bruce Timm described Scarecrow's new outfit as a "Texas Chainsaw Massacre Leatherface kind of look. It really had nothing to do with being a scarecrow per se, but he was definitely scary", while fellow co-creator Paul Dini commented that "[Scarecrow] looked like a hanged man who had been cut down and gone off to terrorize people. We weren't even sure if there was an actual guy in the suit." Throughout his appearances, he creates a new strain of fear toxin that eliminates fear and makes its victims dangerously reckless as well as infects Batgirl with his fear toxin, causing her to have a nightmarish hallucination in which she is killed by him and a vendetta erupts between Batman and her father, Commissioner Gordon.
 Scarecrow was slated to appear in the final season of Justice League Unlimited as a member of Gorilla Grodd's Secret Society, but these plans were cancelled due to an embargo limiting the use of Batman characters at the time.

Film

Live-action
 Director Tim Burton intended to include Scarecrow alongside the Riddler in Batman Forever (1995) until Burton was replaced by Joel Schumacher, who chose to use Two-Face instead.
 A character credited as "Banker", retroactively identified as Jonathan Crane, makes a cameo appearance in Batman & Robin (1997), portrayed by Coolio, who was intended to appear as Scarecrow in future sequels until they were cancelled.
 Scarecrow was planned to appear in Batman Unchained, with Nicolas Cage, Steve Buscemi, and Jeff Goldblum being courted for the role.
 The Scarecrow appears in unused concept art for Suicide Squad (2016).

The Dark Knight Trilogy

The Scarecrow appears in Christopher Nolan's The Dark Knight Trilogy, portrayed by Cillian Murphy. This version wears a burlap sack with a built-in rebreather that doubles as a gas mask for his fear experiments. Murphy explained that the relatively simple mask, as opposed to the full scarecrow costume seen in the comics, was utilized because he "wanted the Scarecrow to avoid the Worzel Gummidge look, because he's not a very physically imposing man—he's more interested in the manipulation of the mind and what that can do".
 In Batman Begins (2005), Dr. Jonathan Crane is a corrupt psychopharmacologist and Arkham Asylum's Chief Administrator. He secretly creates a fear-inducing hallucinogen and plots with Ra's al Ghul and Carmine Falcone to smuggle the toxin into Gotham City, in exchange for Crane's testimony that Falcone's men should be declared legally insane and transferred to Arkham under his care. When Falcone attempts to blackmail him, Batman interferes, and Assistant District Attorney Rachel Dawes exposes his illegal operations, Crane exposes them to his fear toxin. Batman gains Lucius Fox's help in creating an antidote before curing himself and Dawes and exposing Crane to his own toxin, after which he is institutionalized at Arkham. Crane later escapes amidst a mass breakout and Ra's plot to plunge Gotham into fear, taking the name "Scarecrow" in the process.
 In The Dark Knight (2008), Scarecrow's drug deal with the Chechen is interrupted by Batman imposters before the real Batman arrives to apprehend Scarecrow and his gang.
 In The Dark Knight Rises (2012), Crane is among the inmates at Blackgate Penitentiary who are freed during Bane's takeover of Gotham. Crane later presides over a show trial held against Gotham's wealthiest citizens wherein he offers them a choice between death and exile.

Animation
 Scarecrow appears in the Batman: Gotham Knight segment "In Darkness Dwells", voiced by Corey Burton.
 Scarecrow makes a cameo appearance in Batman: Assault on Arkham, voiced by Christian Lanz.
 Scarecrow appears in the DC Animated Movie Universe (DCAMU) short film Nightwing and Robin, voiced by Michael Rosenbaum.
 Scarecrow appears in Batman Unlimited: Monster Mayhem, voiced by Brian T. Delaney. This version is tall, muscular, has green skin, and wields a sickle. Among other supervillains, he joins forces with the Joker's gang of monsters to wreak mayhem on Gotham City.
 Scarecrow appears in Lego DC Comics Super Heroes: Justice League: Gotham City Breakout, voiced by an uncredited John DiMaggio.
 Scarecrow appears in The Lego Batman Movie, voiced by Jason Mantzoukas.
 Scarecrow makes a non-speaking appearance in Scooby-Doo! & Batman: The Brave and the Bold.
 Scarecrow appears in Batman vs. Teenage Mutant Ninja Turtles, voiced by Jim Meskimen. This version is mutated by the Joker into an anthropomorphic crow before fighting Batman and Leonardo until he is cured by Batgirl and Donatello's retro mutagen.
 Scarecrow makes a minor appearance in Batman: Hush, voiced by Chris Cox.
 Scarecrow appears in Happy Halloween, Scooby-Doo!, voiced by Dwight Schultz.
 Scarecrow appears in Batman: The Long Halloween, voiced by Robin Atkin Downes.
 Scarecrow makes a cameo appearance in Injustice.

Video games
 Scarecrow appears in Batman: The Animated Series (1993).
 Scarecrow appears in The Adventures of Batman & Robin.
 Scarecrow appears in Batman: Rise of Sin Tzu, voiced again by Jeffrey Combs.
 Scarecrow appears in the Batman Begins tie-in game, voiced by Cillian Murphy.
 Scarecrow appears in the Nintendo DS version of Batman: The Brave and the Bold – The Videogame.
 Scarecrow appears in DC Universe Online, voiced by Christopher S. Field.
 Scarecrow appears in The Dark Knight Rises tie-in mobile game.
 Scarecrow makes a cameo appearance in Injustice: Gods Among Us as part of the Arkham Asylum stage. This version's design is based on his original Batman: Arkham design.
 Scarecrow appears in Scribblenauts Unmasked: A DC Comics Adventure.
 Scarecrow appears in the Batman arcade game.
 Scarecrow appears as a playable character in Injustice 2, voiced by Robert Englund. This version is a member of Gorilla Grodd's Society whose design is partially inspired by The Dark Knight Trilogy incarnation. In his non-canonical arcade mode ending, he defeats Brainiac and steals his ship to use as his new laboratory so he can study the fears of the thousands of civilizations that Brainiac collected.

Lego series

 Scarecrow appears as a boss in Lego Batman: The Videogame, with vocal effects provided by Dave Wittenberg.
 Scarecrow appears as an unlockable playable character in Lego Batman 2: DC Super Heroes, voiced by Nolan North.
 The Batman Begins incarnation of Scarecrow appears as a playable character in Lego Batman 3: Beyond Gotham via downloadable content.
 Scarecrow appears in Lego DC Super-Villains, voiced again by Jeffrey Combs. This version is a member of the Legion of Doom.

Batman: Arkham

The Scarecrow appears in the Batman: Arkham video game series, voiced initially by Dino Andrade and later by John Noble. This version wields a mechanical gauntlet with four hypodermic needles laced with his fear toxin.
 Introduced as a boss in Batman: Arkham Asylum (2009), he is among the inmates freed during the Joker's takeover of the titular asylum. Across three encounters with Batman, the Scarecrow exposes him to his fear toxin, but the former overcomes his fears. Scarecrow flees to the sewers to infect Gotham's water supply, only to be attacked by Killer Croc and dragged into the water. In one of three possible post-credits scenes, Scarecrow emerges from the ocean and grabs a floating crate of Titan formula.
 Scarecrow returns in Batman: Arkham Knight (2015), having aligned himself with the titular Arkham Knight, Simon Stagg, and several of Gotham City's supervillains in an attempt to kill Batman. After being mauled by Killer Croc and surgically reconstructing his disfigured face to resemble his mask, Scarecrow forces the civilian evacuation of Gotham by threatening to unleash his new, more potent strain of fear toxin on Halloween, allowing the Knight's militia to occupy the city. Over the course of the game, he manufactures the toxin at Ace Chemicals in an attempt to cover the Eastern Seaboard with fear gas, kidnaps Barbara Gordon, and betrays Stagg to seize control of his "Cloudburst" device to spread his toxin across Gotham, only to be thwarted by Batman while Poison Ivy sacrifices herself to reverse the toxin's effects. Following the Arkham Knight's defeat, his militia defect to Scarecrow, who tries to force Commissioner Jim Gordon to kill Batman in exchange for Barbara's life. While Batman rescues her, the militia kidnap Jim and Robin to force Batman to surrender at Arkham Asylum. Scarecrow unmasks Batman as Bruce Wayne on live television before injecting him with fear toxin, but Batman overcomes his fears once more and subdues Scarecrow with his own toxin, after which he is taken into GCPD custody.
 A young Scarecrow appears as a playable character in Batman: Arkham Underworld (2016).

Miscellaneous
 The DCAU incarnation of the Scarecrow appears in The Batman Adventures. Series writer Ty Templeton stated during an interview that he originally wanted to use the Scarecrow in a story which would have revealed why an accident and a murder trial provoked him to change his costume, as his face was never seen in The New Batman Adventures, but the series was canceled before the reason could be revealed.
 Scarecrow appears in the Injustice: Gods Among Us prequel comic. The Joker poisons Scarecrow with his laughing gas, putting him in a coma in the process, to steal his fear toxin and use it for his plans. The Flash later finds Scarecrow's body and transfers him to S.T.A.R. Labs' custody, where Scarecrow recovers years later.
 Jonathan Crane / Scarecrow appears in Batman '66 #28. This version was abandoned by his parents before he was adopted and raised in a small Appalachian town called Jitters Holler. Growing up, he was bullied by his adoptive brother Zeke, who constantly scared him with a scarecrow. After leaving to attend college, Crane travels to Gotham City to exact revenge, only to be defeated by Batman and Robin.
 Scarecrow makes non-speaking appearances in the Batman Unlimited web series.

References